The 1955 Walker Cup, the 15th Walker Cup Match, was played on 20 and 21 May 1955, on the Old Course at St Andrews, Scotland. The United States won by 10 matches to 2.

The United States won all four of the foursomes matches on the first day. Great Britain and Ireland won just two of the singles matches on the second day, both at the final hole, to give the United States a convincing victory.  William C. Campbell, the United States playing captain, did not select himself for any of the matches.

Format
Four 36-hole matches of foursomes were played on Friday and eight singles matches on Saturday. Each of the 12 matches was worth one point in the larger team competition. If a match was all square after the 36th hole extra holes were not played. The team with most points won the competition. If the two teams were tied, the previous winner would retain the trophy.

Teams
Great Britain & Ireland had a team of 10 plus a non-playing captain. The United States only selected a team of 9, which included a playing captain.

Great Britain & Ireland
 & 
Captain:  Alec Hill
 David Blair
 Ian Caldwell
 Joe Carr
 Robin Cater
 Cecil Ewing
 Gerald Micklem
 Bunny Millward
 John Llewellyn Morgan
 Philip Scrutton
 Ronnie White

United States

Playing captain: William C. Campbell
Don Cherry
Joe Conrad
Bruce Cudd
Jimmy Jackson
Dale Morey
Billy Joe Patton
Harvie Ward
Dick Yost

Friday's foursomes

Saturday's singles

References

Walker Cup
Golf tournaments in Scotland
Walker Cup
Walker Cup
Walker Cup